John Cathanach MacDonald, 4th of Dunnyveg (Scottish Gaelic: Seán Cathanach Mac Dhòmhnaill), Scottish-Gaelic lord, killed 1499.

Biography 
MacDonald was a son of John Mor MacDonald, 3rd of Dunnyveg and Sabina, daughter of Felim O'Neill of Clandeboy. John Mor was charged with treason and refused to surrender to King James IV of Scotland. With his father and three sons they were captured through the treachery of their kinsman, John MacIan of Ardnamurchan. MacDonald and his sons (John Mor, John Og, and Donald Balloch) were tried, convicted of treason and hung on the Boroughmuir (now Burgh Muir) in 1499. (A fourth son, Alexander, had fled to Ireland and thus became the next head of the lineage.)

Family
By his wife, Cecelia, daughter of Robert Savage, Lord of the Ardes, they had the following children:

Alexander, fled to Ireland, married Catherine, daughter of John Macdonald of Ardnamurchan, died in 1538 at Stirling, Scotland
John Mor, executed in 1499 with his father.
John Og, executed in 1499 with his father.
Donald Balloch, executed in 1499 with his father.
Angus Ileach, fled to Ireland.
Agnes, who firstly married Donald Gallach MacDonald, 3rd of Sleat, had issue; and secondly married Torquil MacLeod of Lewes, had issue.

References
 MacDonald, Angus & Archibald MacDonald, The Clan Donald, The Northern Counties Publishing Company, Wentworth Press (12 March 2019); 

1499 deaths
John
John
15th-century Scottish people
Medieval Gaels
Medieval Gaels from Scotland
Year of birth unknown